Cherry is a given name. Notable people with the name include:

Cherry Chevapravatdumrong, American screenwriter 
Cherry Logan Emerson (chemist) (1916–2007), American chemist
Cherry Hood (born 1960), Australian artist
Cherry Jones (born 1956), American actress
Cherry Kearton (1871–1940), British photographer
Cherry Mardia, Indian actress 
Cherry Marshall (1923-2006), British fashion model and agent
Cherry Smith (1943–2008), American vocalist
Cherry Wainer (1935–2014), South African musician
Cherry Wilder (1930–2002), New Zealand writer
Cherry Valance The Outsiders

See also
 Cherry (disambiguation)

English feminine given names